Footballer Wants a Wife is a comedy series created by Ben Nicholas The series was funded through Screen Australia's Multi Platform drama funding program and aired in September 2015. The series was produced by Julian Vincent Costanzo and Jonathan Dutton. The series was written by Ben Nicholas and Carl J Sorheim. The series starred Ben Nicholas, Martin Copping and Jonathan Buckley.

References

Australian comedy television series
2015 Australian television series debuts